Cydney W. "Cyd" Adams (1949–2005) was an American poet and academic. Known for his masterful command of imagery and language in his works, his writing is sometimes looked upon as a successor to the work of Dylan Thomas, who was one of Adams' chief influences.  Adams portrayed his background as an East Texas farmer and his passion for hard physical labor into his writing. Adams had a masterly, elegant way of writing about the trials and tribulations of the common working man. His depictions of East Texas and its people earned him the title of Poet Laureate of East Texas in 2001, and many of his poems are acknowledged as some of the best poetry written in any language. Adams was also a professor of English and literature at his alma mater, Stephen F. Austin State University in Nacogdoches, Texas, for nearly 30 years. His passion for teaching and his friendships with many of his colleagues were also recurring themes in his work.

Much of Adams' work has been featured in literary magazines and in anthologies, and in the late 1990s, Adams began a creative partnership with his close friend and colleague Charles Jones, an art professor at SFA. The partnership resulted in the award-winning book "Blackjack Bull Pine and Post-Oak Glade." Some of his other books include "On the Perimeter" and "The Labor That a Man Takes."  All of his publications are included in the Oxford University Library.

Passion for teaching, family, and friendships were recurring themes in his work. He motivated and encouraged students to have high standards. He taught in a way that inspired them to love the material the way he loved it. Above all, he cared about his students and wanted them to learn.   It never failed to disappoint him that some were simply not interested.

Adams was a person of great artistic ability and creativity. In addition to writing, he was a woodcarver, sculptor, bricklayer, and a talented gardener and farmer, who brought skill and care to everything he did. He found solace in the rhythm of swimming, which cleared his mind and allowed him to “hear” some of his best lines of poetry.

He was a talented and unique artist as well as a sincere, sensitive, and beautiful soul.  He had a great passion for people and literature.  He invested himself totally in both.

Cyd Adams died in May 2005 in Nacogdoches. He is buried in the historic Harmony Hill Cemetery in Rusk County, Texas, where his striking monument is engraved with his own epitaph:

Let the land lose my name but 
witness with affection the 
reverence of my fingers, 
caresses of my hand.

Let God who pressed me of it 
accept my work as 
my faith, my prayer, 
and let it stand.

One of Adams' best-known poems is sometimes titled either “July Wall Poem” or “Mason’s Man” and is a tribute to his father, W.T. Adams.

“The Mason’s Man”*
Cyd Adams

IT was just about my life ago;
You were Mason to a Wall, young and strong and angry, cursing the mortar dry,
The stones to set sooner, eager to scaffold up

Then I came along.And then, we worked on the Wall, I and you, I for you, Though at times we were one to a side.I mixed the mortar, barrowed it to you,Set up stones for you to lay;I followed the crease in your trouser knee, the imprint of your boot;Watching you work in wonder:Your trowel was fascination—your hammer precision’s portrait--And I raked your joints reverently, Dreaming of my dayAnd dreaming away my day,And so . . .You are the Wall's MasonI the Mason’s Man;We work together silentlyI in your shadow;Often you turn and smile at me, And at rare moments speak.I am learning to listenI pray someday to seeAnd the Wall grows.You are the Wall’s MasonI the Mason's Man,You fit the fieldstones firmly, set them tight and straight;And the Wall growsMarches toward God to the blood-steady beat of mud-hoe in mortar-box,To the haughty tune of hammer and trowel.You are the Wall’s MasonI the Mason's Man,And I harbor a hatred for its growing height;I have come to fear its finish.For what shall I do? . . . Upon Whom Call?Left without the Mason when he finishes his Wall?I shall be directionlessA Man without his Master;Merely a Mover of Stones—to and fro . . .You are the Wall’s MasonI the Mason's Man,You curse less often now . . . lay up stones more slowly;But your trowel is mortar-laden; another stone is poised;And soon . . . Too soon . . . Fixed and Firm and Final.I am raking out the joints now . . . brushing down the stones.You are just beyond the corner; Your trowel is tinkling as you strike it mortar-free.I tune my movements to itHasten to catch up to you,And trust that you’ll be waiting for me,Waiting, still patiently just on the other side.But the morning mists have burned away;We have seen, too, through the dust;And though we race with midday,I pray we dawdle t’ward the dusk.''

*copyright Cydney Adams' Estate(used with permission)

External links

1949 births
2005 deaths
21st-century American poets
Stephen F. Austin State University alumni
20th-century American poets
Poets from Texas